Valley View is an unincorporated community in Wichita County, Texas, United States. It has an estimated population of 200.

Valley View is part of the Wichita Falls, Texas Metropolitan Statistical Area.

Geography
Valley View is located on Farm Road 2226, eight miles southwest of Wichita Falls in southwestern Wichita County. Its elevation is 1,007 feet above sea level.

History
Valley View was established in 1889 and soon became a community center for area farmers. An elementary school was constructed in 1927 to serve 300 students. An Independent School District was established the following year. By 1931, the district had a total of 555 students and 13 teachers, at the time making it the largest such educational unit in a Texas community without a post office. In the following years, the population declined and in 1970, the Valley View school district had consolidated with that of Iowa Park, keeping only grades one through six in operation locally. At the completion of the 1980 school year, the Valley View School closed permanently.

The community had a population of approximately 200 in 1990, a figure that remains the same today.

Education
Valley View is part of the Iowa Park Consolidated Independent School District.

External links
Handbook of Texas Online: Valley View, Texas

Unincorporated communities in Texas
Unincorporated communities in Wichita County, Texas